Pentangle may refer to:
Pentagram, a five-pointed star drawn with five straight strokes
Pentangle (band), a British folk rock band
The Pentangle (album), a 1968 album by Pentangle
Miss Pentangle, a character from The Worst Witch